The Rennie Memorial Medal is an Australian National Award that is awarded annually to a financial member of the Royal Australian Chemical Institute with less than 8 years of professional experience since completing their most recent relevant qualification of a BSc, BSc (Hons), MSc or PhD, or the equivalent, "for the person who has contributed most towards the development of some branch of chemical science".

The contribution is judged by the research work published during the ten (10) years immediately preceding the award.

Named after Edward Rennie, the medal was first awarded in 1931 to R J Best. The medal is awarded annually, although no awards were made in the years 1938, 1939, 1962, 1980. The medal has on occasion been awarded to two recipients.

List of recipients
Source: Royal Australian Chemical Institute

See also

 List of chemistry awards

References

Australian science and technology awards
1931 establishments in Australia
Awards established in 1931